David Bruce Hendin (born December 16, 1945) is an expert American numismatist specializing in ancient Jewish and Biblical coins and their archaeology. Throughout his career, Hendin has also been known as a medical journalist, newspaper columnist, publishing executive, literary agent, and author. Some of Hendin's books include Death as a Fact of Life and the reference Guide to Biblical Coins.

Early life and education
David Bruce Hendin is the son of Aaron and Celeste Sherman Hendin (died 1948) and Lillian Karsh Hendin (married 1949). Hendin spent his early years in St. Louis. After graduating from Ladue Horton Watkins High School in 1963, Hendin attended the University of Missouri in Colombia where he received his Bachelor of Science in Biology in 1967. In 1971, Hendin received his MA Degree from Missouri's School of Journalism.

Jewish-Biblical numismatics
Hendin's interest in ancient Jewish and Biblical coins began in 1967 during a year-long stint as a biology teacher at an agricultural high school near the Israeli town of Ashkelon. During this time, Hendin learned to speak Hebrew and became interested in the study of ancient Jewish and Biblical coins. Aaron Hendin, David's father, had been a long-time collector and student of ancient Jewish coins, though David had not previously shown interested in the subject.

The younger Hendin went on to be mentored by Ya’akov Meshorer, professor of Archaeology and Numismatics at Hebrew University and Chief Curator of the Israel Museum, where he founded the numismatic department. Hendin edited and published Meshorer's Ancient Jewish Coinage Vols. I & 2 as well as the English edition of Meshorer's A Treasury of Jewish Coins. Upon Meshorer's death in 2002, Hendin helped establish the Meshorer Prize in Numismatics given by the Israel Museum. He now sits on the board that awards this prize. Also among Hendin's mentors was Dan Barag, professor of Archaeology and Numismatics at Hebrew University and Shraga Qedar.

In 1985 and 1986, Hendin returned to Israel as the chief numismatist of the Joint Sepphoris Project excavations under the auspices of Duke University (Eric and Carol Meyers) and Hebrew University (Ehud Netzer). He again excavated in 2011 with the Duke team.

Hendin has published more than 50 articles in this field. In 1992, Hendin was elected a Fellow of the American Numismatic Society and is now a Life Fellow. He has donated many numismatic and archaeological objects to the Israel Museum, Jerusalem and was honored in 2001 as a Sponsor of the Israel Museum. He is also a trustee and adjunct curator at the American Numismatic Society.

Journalism career
From 1970 to 1993, David Hendin worked with Scripps Howard's United Feature Syndicate (UFS) and Newspaper Enterprise Association. His first column, Man and his World, was the first syndicated newspaper column on ecology and ran from 1970 until 1973. Following this, Hendin wrote another syndicated newspaper column, The Medical Consumer, which was published for six years (1973–1979). In 1973, Hendin's book Death as a Fact of Life was serialized in the New York Post and other newspapers nationwide.

Overall, Hendin wrote more than 1,000 articles for newspapers and magazines, including Saturday Review, Reader’s Digest, and Science News. His writing has been hailed as “brilliant and highly sensitive,” by The New York Times and The Washington Post praised Hendin's writing as “journalism of the highest order.” Hendin became the Senior Vice President and Editorial Director for United Feature Syndicate in 1980. In that position, Hendin was responsible for signing many columnists and cartoonists, including the following:
Scott Adams (Dilbert)
 Julian Bond
Alan Dershowitz
 Peter Gott
 Michael Kinsley
 Ed Koch
 Mort Kondracke
Judith Martin (Miss Manners)
George McGovern
Lincoln Pierce (Big Nate)
 Senator William Proxmire
Ben J. Wattenberg
Elaine Viets
Jeffrey Zazlow

Hendin also worked with Pulitzer Prize winning muckraker Jack Anderson and many cartoonists, including Charles M. Schulz (Peanuts), Jim Davis (Garfield), Mort Walker (Beetle Bailey, Gamin & Patches), Mike Peters, and artist Peter Max. In 1992, he was a featured speaker at Ohio State University's Festival of Cartoon Art. From 1971 until 1986, in addition to his work with the UFS, Hendin taught as an Adjunct Professor of Journalism and established a New York Science Journalism program at the University of Missouri School of Journalism. In 1975 and 1976, Hendin lectured as an adjunct professor on science and medical journalism at Columbia University's Graduate School of Journalism. Hendin has served on the boards of trustees of the Scripps Howard Foundation, American Friends of the Bible Lands Museum/Jerusalem, the Kinsey Institute for Sex, Gender and Reproduction, The Newspaper Comics Council, the Holy Land Conservation Fund, and the Council for the Advancement of Science Writing. In 1993, Hendin left UFS and became a consultant and literary agent. Prior to his retirement, he his clients, included the following:
Judith Martin (Miss Manners)
Mike Peters
Lincoln Peirce (Big Nate)
Charles M. Schulz (Peanuts)
 Abraham Twerski
Elaine Viets
Tom Wilson (Ziggy)

Hendin was also co-executive producer of the 1993 PBS Special Miss Manners and Company.

Personal life 
Hendin has been married since 1985 to Jeannie (née Luciano), retired vice-chair and director of trade publishing at W.W. Norton & Co. Publishers. He has three children: Sarah, born 1972; Ben, born 1975; and Alexander, born 1990.

Bibliography
 2007: Ancient Scale Weights and Pre-Coinage Currency of the Near East, Amphora Books, NY. .
 2005: Not Kosher: Forgeries of Ancient Jewish and Biblical Coins, *Amphora Books, NY. .
	1978: The Genetic Connection (with Joan Marks), William Morrow, NY, 1978. (Translations: Hebrew, Portuguese). .
	1978: Collecting Coins, Signet Books, NY. .
 1977: The Life Givers, William Morrow, NY, 1977. (1977 Book of the Year, American Medical Writer's Association). 
	1977: The World Almanac Whole Health Guide, Signet/NAL, NY. Lib. Congress 76-48583.
	1976: Guide to Ancient Jewish Coins, Attic Books, NY. .
 1987: Guide to Biblical Coins, 2nd Edition Revised and Expanded, Amphora Books, NY. .
 1996: Guide to Biblical Coins, 3rd Edition Revised and Expanded, Amphora Books, NY. .
 2001: Guide to Biblical Coins, 4th Edition Revised and Expanded, Amphora Books, NY. .
 2010: Guide to Biblical Coins, 5th Edition, Amphora Books, NY. .
	1972: Save Your Child’s Life, Enterprise Books, NY, 1972; Doubleday-Dolphin, NY,
1974, Save Your Child’s Life, Revised: Pharos Books, NY, 1986. (Translations: Spanish, Portuguese). .
	1973: Death as a Fact of Life, W.W. Norton, NY, 1973; Warner Books, NY, 1974; W.W. Norton, NY, 1984. (Translations: Japanese, Chinese, Russian). .
	1971: The Doctor’s Save Your Heart Diet (recipes by Aileen Claire), Award Books (Grosset & Dunlap), NY. ASIN: B001II11MY
	1971: Everything You Need to Know About Abortion, Pinnacle Books, NY. ASIN: B0006W2GPE

Awards 
 2013: Gunnar Holst Numismatic Foundation Medal, Swedish Numismatic Society, University of Gothenburg, Gothenburg, Sweden.
 2013: Best Museum Exhibit Catalog of Year. Coins of the Holy Land, the Abraham and Marian Sofaer Collection at the American Numismatic Society and The Israel Museum (American Numismatic Society), Numismatic Literary Guild.
 2012: Best Auction Catalog of Year. The Shoshana Collection of Ancient Judean Coins I (Heritage), Numismatic Literary Guild.
 2012: Best Museum Exhibit Catalog of Year. Cultural Change, Jewish, Christian, and Islamic Coins of the Holy Land (American Numismatic Society), Numismatic Literary Guild.
 2011: Sundman Lecture, American Numismatic Association
 2003: Presidential Award, American Numismatic Association.
 2002: Distinguished Alumnus, Horton Watkins (Ladue) High School, St. Louis, Mo.
 2000 & 1993: Best Magazine Column Award, Numismatic Literary Guild.
 1996: Ben Odesser Judaic Literary Award, American Israel Numismatic Association.
 1992: Life Fellow, American Numismatic Society.
 1976: Book of the Year (The Life Givers), American Medical Writer's Association.
 1974: Who’s Who in America (1974-), Who’s Who in the World (1995-).
 1974: Claude Bernard Science Journalism Award (Honorable Mention), National Society for Medical Research. 
 1973: Howard Blakeslee Award, American Heart Association.
 1972: Medical Journalism Award, American Medical Association.

References

External links
Hendin and the Ancient Coin Collectors Guild
Hendin biography on the Amphora Coins website
 

1945 births
Living people
American information and reference writers
American medical journalists
American numismatists
American social sciences writers
Missouri School of Journalism alumni
Writers from St. Louis
Ladue Horton Watkins High School alumni